Versluis is a Dutch surname. It is a collapsed version of Van der Sluis" meaning "from the locks / sluice". As such, it could have a toponymic origin or could be a metonymic occupational surname (the lock keeper). Variant forms are Versluijs and Versluys. The concentration of the latter form around the town Sluis in Zeelandic Flanders  may suggest an origin in that town instead. Notable people with the surname include:

Versluis
Arthur Versluis (born 1959), American esotericism and transcendentalism researcher
Johan Versluis (born 1983), Dutch footballer
Matthias Versluis (born 1994), Finnish figure skater
Mechiel Versluis (born 1987), Dutch rower
Versluijs/Versluys
Annette Versluys-Poelman (1853–1914), Dutch suffragist and philanthropist
 (1923–2011), Dutch television and theater actress
Jan Versluys (1873–1939), Dutch zoologist
Patrick Versluys (born 1958), Belgian racing cyclist
Stephanus Versluijs (1694–1736), Dutch Governor of Ceylon 1729–1732

See also
James J. Versluis, a Chicago tugboat named in 1957 after Chicago's engineer of water works James J. Versluis
Versluys Arena, a multi-use stadium in Ostend, Belgium

References

Dutch-language surnames
Occupational surnames
Toponymic surnames

nl:Versluis